Saint-Sauveur is a commune in the Oise department in northern France.

Mineral water spring
Among the numerous ponds and springs which dot the surrounding Compiègne Forest, the Spring of Saint-Sauveur is widely regarded as therapeutic. The spring, which is a pair of two separate mineral water springs, runs both hot and cold and is reputed to provide relief for rheumatism and other ailments.

See also
Communes of the Oise department

References

Communes of Oise